"Thump Shit" is a song by American rappers 42 Dugg and EST Gee, released on April 5, 2022 as the fourth single from their collaborative mixtape Last Ones Left (2022).

Composition
The song, described as "bouncing and hooky", features a "bumpin'" bass. In his verse, 42 Dugg brags about being able to sell drugs, while Est Gee raps about violence.

Critical reception
Joe Price of Complex praised the song, writing that it "showcases their chemistry as they effortlessly deliver their verses over some chaotic production." Similarly, Aron A. of HotNewHipHop wrote that the song is "yet another reminder why they are two of the most exciting rappers out right now." Writing for Pitchfork, Alphonse Pierre described that the topic of 42 Dugg's verse "fits oddly" with that of EST Gee's.

Music video
A music video for the song was released on April 8, 2022. Directed by Diesel Films, it finds 42 Dugg and EST Gee flamboyantly wearing their jewelry. Rapper Lil Baby makes a cameo appearance in a nightclub.

Charts

References

2022 singles
2022 songs
42 Dugg songs
EST Gee songs
Interscope Records singles
Collective Music Group singles
Songs written by 42 Dugg
Songs written by EST Gee